The 520s decade ran from January 1, 520, to December 31, 529.

Significant people
 Ahkal Mo' Nahb I, Ajaw (Lord) of Palenque (Mayan Empire)
 Boethius, philosopher
 Childebert I, Frankish king, 524-558
 Clodoald, saint
 Chlodomer, King of Orleans, 511-524
 Chlothar I, Frankish King
 Dionysius Exiguus, inventor of the Anno Domini
 Godomar, King of Burgundy
 Guntheuc, Queen of Orleans
 Justin I, Eastern Roman Emperor, 518-527
 Kaleb of Axum, King of Ethiopia
 Sigismund of Burgundy, King of the Burgundians, 516-524
 Theoderic the Great, King of the Ostrogoths, 475-526

References